The 1992 Nigerian Senate election in Jigawa State was held on July 4, 1992, to elect members of the Nigerian Senate to represent Jigawa State. Ibrahim Musa Kazaure representing Jigawa West and Musa Bako Abdullahi Aujara representing Jigawa Central won on the platform of Social Democratic Party, while Muhammad Ubali Shittu representing Jigawa East won on the platform of the National Republican Convention.

Overview

Summary

Results

Jigawa West 
The election was won by Ibrahim Musa Kazaure of the Social Democratic Party.

Jigawa Central 
The election was won by Musa Bako Abdullahi Aujara of the Social Democratic Party.

Jigawa East 
The election was won by Muhammad Ubali Shittu of the National Republican Convention.

References 

Jig
Jigawa State Senate elections
July 1992 events in Nigeria